C.A. Suleiman is a writer, game designer, and musician who has worked primarily in dark fantasy and horror for role-playing games and fiction. Through the course of his career, he has been a guest of honor or attending professional at over 140 conventions across seven countries.

Early life and education
Suleiman attended the Landon School as a child and Churchill High School, and went to the University of Maryland in the late 1990s.

Career
C.A. Suleiman has contributed to books for Dungeons & Dragons and the World of Darkness. Suleiman co-wrote Vampire: The Requiem and conceived and developed the Mummy: The Curse line.

His D&D work includes City of Stormreach, Cityscape, Dragonmarked, Heroes of Horror, and Faiths of Eberron.

He launched a transmedia fantasy property called The Lost Citadel, based around the meshing of zombie horror and traditional fantasy tropes. The world debuted with a fiction anthology, and then with a Kickstarted game line.

C.A. Suleiman created and developed a Cthulhu Mythos game and setting called Unspeakable: Sigil & Sign, which focuses on the Old One cultists as protagonists.

In late 2017, the Horror Writers Association banned Suleiman from its events in response to accusations of sexual harassment; Green Ronin, publisher of The Lost Citadel fiction anthology and role-playing game, then distanced itself from Suleiman over the same allegations, despite co-owner Nicole Lindroos' maintaining of Suleiman's innocence.

Music
C.A. Suleiman is the founder of the Washington, D.C.-based interstitial rock group Toll Carom.

References

External links
Official website

Dungeons & Dragons game designers
Living people
Role-playing game designers
Year of birth missing (living people)